Local iQ was a free arts, culture, and entertainment biweekly magazine published in Albuquerque, New Mexico. It featured information about various artists, celebrities, and entertainers within New Mexico's largest city, and was distributed to subscribers across New Mexico's largest markets. Its coverage spanned art, fashion, entertainment, design, food, architecture, travel and more. Francine Maher Hopper is the founder and the publisher. Launched as a quarterly in 2006, the magazine eventually stopped being printed in 2014. Their website is no longer active.

The magazine, and its website, have been recommended by travel guides, such at those by Fodor's, and has covered many events within New Mexico and Albuquerque's entertainment scenes, including interviewing Breaking Bad star Bryan Cranston, Etsy's and Levitated Toy Factory's cofounder Jared Tarbell, and author John Nichols.

See also
Weekly Alibi

Notes

External links

Biweekly magazines published in the United States
Lifestyle magazines published in the United States
News magazines published in the United States
Online magazines published in the United States
Quarterly magazines published in the United States
Defunct magazines published in the United States
English-language magazines
Free magazines
Magazines established in 2006
Magazines disestablished in 2014
Magazines published in New Mexico
Mass media in Albuquerque, New Mexico
Online magazines with defunct print editions